Footytube was a football video community. The website attracted over 1.4 million unique monthly users, with around 16m pageviews. and is listed in Alexa as being the 18th most visited football site in the world.

The site used to aggregate vast amounts of football data and present it in a contextualized fashion to the user, covering everything from the latest highlights to fan made content, player interviews and club podcasts.  The site also had a wide-ranging set of community features geared towards the football enthusiast.  Users used to be able to create profiles and compete in the footytube fan valuation, fantasy football and fan trait leagues. As of 2019, the site has been permanently offline.

Recognition

Footytube appeared in The Daily Telegraph newspaper's Top 25 Football Websites in 2009 and was also a featured site in The Guardian's "Guide" and "Things we like this week" sections.  The website is also featured in The Guardian'''s open platform gallery.

Footytube is often mentioned in tweets by sporting celebrities and football journalists, including Tim Lovejoy, who described the site as a "Footie Fans Heaven".

History

Footytube was founded in July 2006 in what initially began as a wordpress blog showcasing the latest football videos from around the world. The blog quickly grew in popularity with supporters, and before long was attracting upwards of 100,000 unique visitors per month. In early 2007, footytube was acquired by Lee Smith and Matthew Jackson, two web developers and internet entrepreneurs with a passion for football.

The current incarnation of the website (Footytube 2.0) spent a total of 18 months in development, before a closed beta version was released in February 2009.  The Footytube 2.0 Beta went public in May 2009.  Dispensing with the old blog, the site deploys a state-of-the-art custom web crawler for aggregating vast amounts of football data from around the world.

The new version of the site also saw various football community centric features released, including Dreamfooty, a proprietary fantasy football league game.

The current version of the site is the 2.1.5 'SpreadLight' Release.

The next major release (2.2) is expected in August 2010, some features of which will be unveiled during the 2010 World Cup.

Technology

Footytube claim to have the most advanced football web crawler on the internet.  The bot aggregates football videos, news, podcasts, blogs, fixtures, results, odds, and team stats and displays this data in a contextualized fashion alongside video content and team data.  This is achieved by employing a range of partner APIs and services.

Staff
There are a total of four board members: Tarek Ben (founder), Lee Smith (managing director), Matthew Jackson (communications director) and Vlad Bosinceanu (technical director).

During the latter half of 2009, Araz Heydariyehzadeh joined the commercial department as commercial director.

Side projects – Openfooty

Openfooty is a spin-off project, spearheaded by the footytube team in an effort to support the wider football community.  The project seeks to help encourage the emergence of innovative and compelling websites and ideas by championing open solutions in football.  It represents the first and only free (for non commercial use) football data API available on the internet today.

The API exposes much of the data that is collected via the footytube crawler, as well as data from partnerships with Global Sports Media and The Guardian''.

References

External links
 FootyTube

Football mass media in the United Kingdom
Association football websites